Qeshlaq-e Hajj Heydar Gol Ahmad (also Romanized as Qeshlāq-e Ḩājj Ḩeydar Gol Aḩmad) is a village in Qeshlaq-e Sharqi Rural District, Qeshlaq Dasht District, Bileh Savar County, Ardabil Province, Iran. At the 2006 census, its population was 184, in 39 families.

References 

Towns and villages in Bileh Savar County